The 1919 Harvard Crimson football team was an American football team that represented Harvard University as an independent during the 1919 college football season. In their first season under head coach Bob Fisher, the Crimson compiled a 9–0–1 record, shut out seven of ten opponents, and outscored all opponents by a total of 229 to 19. The team was invited to play in the 1920 Rose Bowl and defeated Oregon, 7–6.

Claim to national championship
There was no contemporaneous system in 1919 for determining a national champion. However, Harvard was retroactively named as the national champion by the Helms Athletic Foundation and the Houlgate System, and as a co-national champion by the College Football Researchers Association, National Championship Foundation, and Parke H. Davis.  Illinois (6–1 record), Notre Dame (9–0 record), and Texas A&M (10–0 record) were chosen as the 1919 national champion or co-champion by some selectors.

Key players
Harvard halfback Eddie Casey was selected as consensus first-team player on the 1919 All-America team. Casey was later inducted into the College Football Hall of Fame.

Other notable players on the 1919 team included backs Arnold Horween and Frederic Cameron Church Jr. and linemen Tom Woods, Charles Arthur "Tubby" Clark and Robert "Duke" Sedgwick. Quarterback Billy Murray was the team captain.

"High-water mark" in Harvard football history
The 1919 season was a transition year for Harvard football. Percy Haughton was the head coach from 1908 to 1916, leading the program to a record of 97–17–6. Varsity football was discontinued during the war years of 1917 and 1918, though the school did field an "informal" team. The 1919 season marked the return of varsity football under a new head coach. Coach Fisher compiled a 43–14–5 record in seven seasons as head coach and was later inducted into the College Football Hall of Fame. Harvard's victory in the 1920 Rose Bowl has been called "the high-water mark" in program history, as athletics were deemphasized in the 1920s and thereafter.

Schedule

References

Harvard
Harvard Crimson football seasons
College football national champions
College football undefeated seasons
Rose Bowl champion seasons
Harvard Crimson football
1910s in Boston